Cottingley railway station serves the Cottingley and Churwell areas of Leeds, West Yorkshire, England. It is the nearest railway station to Leeds United F.C.'s Elland Road stadium.

Following a review, West Yorkshire Combined Authority decided to close Cottingley station rather than retain it, on the grounds of its inaccessibility and that White Rose station was better connected to businesses and places of education.

History
The station was opened by British Rail on 25 April 1988 with financial assistance from West Yorkshire Passenger Transport Executive and is currently managed by Northern Trains; however, most trains that call at Cottingley are now operated by TransPennine Express apart from three peak hour services.

Following the approval of plans for a new White Rose Station  to the south. Cottingley Station is set to close in late 2022 to early 2023. The decision was made due to the station's poor accessibility and the improved location for the new station.

Patronage growth
Patronage at Cottingley station (off Cottingley Drive) has increased significantly in recent years, and this is reflected by the figures published by the Office of the Rail Regulator (ORR). Recorded usage in 2002/03 was 9,467 journeys per year (average of entries and exits).

By 2005/06, this had increased to 73,894 journeys per year, an increase of 781% (almost eightfold) in four years. Actual growth may be higher, since the ORR data does not accurately take account of the multi-modal 'MetroCard' season tickets issued by WYPTE which are valid for journeys to and from this station. From 2008/9, such MetroCard data are included, but only an estimation is made.

Recent growth can also be attributed in part by a significant new housing development adjacent to the railway station, called Churwell New Village.

That, combined with growth elsewhere on the line, means that overcrowding in the morning peak for commuters heading towards Leeds is now a serious problem. Efforts to address this have been hampered by the relatively short platforms at the station, which limited the length of trains that can call here. The platforms have since been extended (towards Leeds) and can now accommodate three car trains easily. Network Rail further extended the platforms in November/December 2018.

Facilities

The station is unmanned and has only basic shelters on each platform. Platform 1 is the ‘down’ platform for trains to Leeds and platform 2 is the ‘up’ platform for trains to Dewsbury, Huddersfield, Brighouse and Manchester.

There are ticket machines on both sides and these were recently been brought into use. Automatic announcements, timetable posters and dot matrix display screens provide train running information.

Step-free access is available to both platforms; however they are linked by a stepped footbridge.

Services

As of December 2020, from Monday to Friday and on Saturdays, there is an hourly service from Cottingley to Leeds and to Huddersfield calling at all intermediate stations. Two early morning services and one evening peak service (06:58 and 07:57 to Leeds, and 17:23 to Wigan North Western) are operated by Northern, with the remainder operated by TransPennine Express. The service pattern is generally XX:21 to Leeds and XX:52 to Huddersfield. The service on a Sunday is similar but starts later. Services are sometimes altered due to engineering work or the COVID-19 pandemic.

Historically, Cottingley had a 05:25 service to Wigan Wallgate, which has now been lost as it instead runs via Bradford Interchange and Halifax.

Scheduled closure
The scheduled opening of the White Rose railway station would, if Cottingley railway station was to remain, mean that there would be two stations within half a mile. As a result a decision to close Cottingley was taken owing to perceived advantages with the location of the White Rose Station over Cottingley.  The proposed White Rose station will primarily serve commercial premises in the form of the White Rose Business Park and the White Rose Shopping Centre, whereas Cottingley station chiefly served residential areas in Cottingley and Churwell.  It is proposed to retain the footbridge to retain a right of way between the Cottingley Estate and the new housing developments in Churwell.

The Office of Road and Rail in February 2023 ratified the future closure of the station.

References

External links

Railway stations in Leeds
DfT Category F2 stations
Railway stations opened by British Rail
Railway stations in Great Britain opened in 1988
Northern franchise railway stations
Railway stations served by TransPennine Express